Albert B. Barney (June 2, 1835 – 1910) was an American lawyer, businessman, and legislator.

Born in Mayville, Wisconsin, Barney went to United States Military Academy and Whitewater Normal School (now University of Wisconsin–Whitewater). He studied law in Mayville, Wisconsin and was admitted to the Wisconsin bar. Barney then practiced law in Spencer, Wisconsin and was involved in real estate. Barney was a justice of the peace. He served in the Wisconsin State Assembly in 1893 and was a Democrat. During different times, Barney was a patient at the Wisconsin State Hospital in Winnebago, Wisconsin.

Notes

1835 births
1910 deaths
People from Mayville, Wisconsin
People from Spencer, Wisconsin
United States Military Academy alumni
University of Wisconsin–Whitewater alumni
Wisconsin lawyers
Businesspeople from Wisconsin
19th-century American politicians
19th-century American businesspeople
19th-century American lawyers
Military personnel from Wisconsin
Democratic Party members of the Wisconsin State Assembly